Cyclopentobarbital sodium (Cyclopal, Dormisan) is a barbiturate derivative invented in the 1940s. It has sedative and anticonvulsant properties, and was used primarily as an anaesthetic in veterinary medicine.  Cyclopal is considered similar in effects to phenobarbital but lasts almost three times as long, and is considered a long-acting barbiturate with a fairly slow onset of action.

See also 
 Barbiturate

References 

Allyl compounds
General anesthetics
Barbiturates
GABAA receptor positive allosteric modulators
Cyclopentenes